The Department of Environment, Housing and Community Development was an Australian government department that existed between December 1975 and December 1978.

History
The Department was announced in December 1975, after the Departments of Tourism and Recreation, Urban and Regional Development,
Housing and Construction  and
the Environment were abolished. The Department was intended to work closely with the States with regards to matters of local concern with a maxim of maximum consultation.

Scope
Information about the department's functions and/or government funding allocation could be found in the Administrative Arrangements Orders, the annual Portfolio Budget Statements and in the Department's annual reports.

At its creation, the Department was responsible for the following:
 Urban and regional planning and development
 Environment and Conservation
 Building industry
 Housing
 Provision of hostel accommodation in the Australian Territories and for immigrants
 Leisure, including sport, physical fitness and community recreation
 Youth affairs.

Structure
The Department was an Australian Public Service department, staffed by officials who were responsible to the Minister for Environment, Housing and Community Development.

References

Ministries established in 1975
Environment, Housing and Community Development